Sergei Ivanovich Shumilin (born 21 February 1990) is a Russian former professional football player.

Career
Shumilin began his career with PFC CSKA Moscow and joined FC Sibir Novosibirsk on loan in January 2009, after his return to CSKA. In December 2009 he played his senior debut in the Commonwealth of Independent States Cup.

In April 2010 he joined the Latvian Virsliga club FK Ventspils. In September 2010 he was loaned out to FC Kryvbas Kryvyi Rih, but in February 2011 he returned to FK Ventspils. In March he was released.

International career
He was a member of the Russia U-19 national team and earned his debut on 17 October 2008 in the qualification to the UEFA European Under-19 Championship

References

External links
 

1990 births
People from Mozhaysk
Living people
Russian footballers
Russia youth international footballers
Russian expatriate footballers
Expatriate footballers in Latvia
Expatriate footballers in Ukraine
FC Sibir Novosibirsk players
Russian Premier League players
FC Kryvbas Kryvyi Rih players
Ukrainian Premier League players
PFC CSKA Moscow players
FK Ventspils players
FC Dynamo Barnaul players
FC Rotor Volgograd players
Expatriate footballers in Armenia
FC Mika players
FC SKA Rostov-on-Don players
FC Tyumen players
Association football forwards
FC Lokomotiv Moscow players
FC Chayka Peschanokopskoye players
Sportspeople from Moscow Oblast